The 68th Academy Awards ceremony, organized by the Academy of Motion Picture Arts and Sciences (AMPAS), honored the best films of 1995 in the United States and took place on March 25, 1996, at the Dorothy Chandler Pavilion in Los Angeles beginning at 6:00 p.m. PST / 9:00 p.m. EST. During the ceremony, AMPAS presented Academy Awards (commonly referred to as Oscars) in 24 categories. The ceremony, televised in the United States by ABC, was produced by David Salzman and Quincy Jones and directed by Jeff Margolis. Actress Whoopi Goldberg hosted the show for the second time, having previously presided over the 66th ceremony in 1994. Three weeks earlier, in a ceremony held at the Regent Beverly Wilshire Hotel in Beverly Hills, California, on March 2, the Academy Awards for Technical Achievement were presented by host Richard Dreyfuss.

Braveheart won five awards, including Best Picture. Other winners included Apollo 13, Pocahontas, Restoration, and The Usual Suspects with two awards and Anne Frank Remembered, Antonia's Line, Babe, A Close Shave, Dead Man Walking, Leaving Las Vegas, Lieberman in Love, Mighty Aphrodite, One Survivor Remembers, Il Postino: The Postman, and Sense and Sensibility with one. The telecast garnered almost 45 million viewers in the United States.

Winners and nominees

The nominees for the 68th Academy Awards were announced on February 13, 1996, at 5:38 a.m. PST (13:38 UTC) at the Samuel Goldwyn Theater by president of the Academy, and the music producer Quincy Jones. Braveheart led all nominees with ten nominations; Apollo 13 came in second with nine.

The winners were announced during the awards ceremony on March 25, 1996. Braveheart was the ninth film to win Best Picture with no acting nominations. With her Best Supporting Actress win for Mighty Aphrodite, Mira Sorvino became the second consecutive actress to win the aforementioned category for a performance in a film directed by Woody Allen. Best Adapted Screenplay winner Emma Thompson was the first person to win Oscars for both acting and screenwriting. She had previously won Best Actress for her performance in the 1992 film Howards End. This was the first year since the 42nd Academy Awards—and last to date—that none of the acting winners appeared in Best Picture nominees.

Awards

Winners are listed first, highlighted in boldface, and indicated with a double dagger.

Academy Honorary Awards
 Chuck Jones
 Kirk Douglas

Special Achievement Award
 John Lasseter for Toy Story

Multiple nominations and awards

The following 19 films received multiple nominations:

The following five films received multiple awards:

Presenters and performers
The following individuals, listed in order of appearance, presented awards or performed musical numbers.

Presenters

Performers

Ceremony information

As a result of the negative reception of David Letterman's stint as host from the preceding year's ceremony, veteran film and television director Gil Cates declined to helm the upcoming festivities. In November 1995, AMPAS recruited music producer and Jean Hersholt Humanitarian Award recipient Quincy Jones as producer of the 1996 ceremony. Jones immediately selected actress and comedian Whoopi Goldberg to host the ceremony. In an interview with Los Angeles Times writer Susan King, Jones explained the decision to hire Goldberg saying, "She has all the qualifications to move on a dime, to carry the elegance and the dignity of the show and is very funny. She understands the street. She has everything."

One segment that was staged during the ceremony was an elaborate fashion show showcasing the nominees for Best Costume Design. Produced by fashion photographer Matthew Rolston, the production featured models such as Cameron Alborzian, Tyson Beckford, Tyra Banks, Marcus Schenkenberg and Joel West sporting various costumes from the five films nominated in the category. Initially, actor Jack Nicholson was approached to introduce the segment along with models Naomi Campbell and Claudia Schiffer. However, actor Pierce Brosnan accepted the role of presenter of the segment and award after Nicholson declined those respective duties.

Several other people and elements were also involved with the production of the ceremony. Jeff Margolis served as director for the program. Actress and talk show host Oprah Winfrey interviewed several nominees and other attendees during a seven-minute red carpet arrival segment shown at the beginning of the telecast. Musician and saxophonist Tom Scott served as musical director for the ceremony. Choreographer Jamie King supervised the performances of the Best Song nominees and two dance numbers. Babe, the pig from the eponymous film, and Miss Piggy participated in a comedy sketch during the proceedings. Actor Christopher Reeve, who was paralyzed in a horse riding accident nearly a year earlier, made a surprise appearance on the telecast urging filmmakers to make movies that face the world's most important issues head-on.

Division of Best Original Score category
Beginning with this ceremony, the AMPAS music branch divided the category of Best Original Score into two categories: Best Dramatic Score and Best Musical or Comedy Score. This was seen as a response to the dominance of Walt Disney Feature Animation films in the Original Score and Original Song categories in recent years. Four years later, the two scoring categories were merged back into one category.

Box office performance of nominees
At the time of the nominations announcement on February 13, the combined gross of the five Best Picture nominees at the US box office was $333 million, with an average of $66.5 million per film. Apollo 13 was the highest earner among the Best Picture nominees with $172 million in domestic box office receipts. The film was followed by Braveheart ($67 million), Babe ($58.2 million), Sense and Sensibility ($24.6 million) and finally Il Postino: The Postman ($10.7 million).

Of the top 50 grossing movies of the year, 47 nominations went to 14 films on the list. Only Toy Story (2nd), Apollo 13 (3rd), Braveheart (23rd), Babe (29th), 12 Monkeys (31st), Casino (38th) and Mr. Holland's Opus (39th) were nominated for directing, acting, screenwriting, or Best Picture. The other box office hits that earned nominations were Batman Forever (1st), Pocahontas (4th), Seven (9th), Crimson Tide (10th), Waterworld (12th), The Bridges of Madison County (21st), The American President (27th) and Sabrina (34th).

Rainbow Coalition protest
Several days before the ceremony, activist group Rainbow Coalition, led by Reverend Jesse Jackson, planned a protest regarding African Americans and other racial minorities in the film industry. The group was voicing its objections to unflattering portrayals of minorities in film and television and the fact that minorities were underemployed in the entertainment industry. Jackson further pointed out the disparity in racial minorities in Hollywood by noting that Best Live Action Short Film nominee Dianne Houston was the only African American nominated that year. Although the group initially planned to demonstrate outside the Dorothy Chandler Pavilion, an agreement between Jackson and producer Jones caused the protest to be moved adjacent to the broadcast facilities of the local ABC affiliate KABC-TV. Nevertheless, Jones remarked that the Academy Awards were not the appropriate venue for such protest declaring "Why should the movie business be different from anything else in America? It's a problem that permeates everything in the country. Every facet of America discriminates."

Critical reviews
The show received a positive reception from most media publications. The New York Times film critic Janet Maslin raved, "Mr. Jones pointedly turned this year's ceremony into a showcase for Hollywood's new guard." She also praised host Goldberg's opening monologue, remarking that it "established the sharpness of this year's gag writing." People columnist Janice Min wrote that "the most egregious crime at the 68th Academy Awards on March 25 was–egad!–the relentless elegance and good taste that deprived viewers of genuine, Grade A snicker fodder. Television critic Howard Rosenberg of the Los Angeles Times applauded Goldberg's performance, noting that her "confident performance [...] was symbolic of her whopping improvement as host over her showing on the 1994 Oscars."

Some media outlets were more critical of the show. Chicago Tribune television critic Steve Johnson lamented that Goldberg "settled into bland script reading that made one long for David Letterman's cranky unpredictability in the role last year." He also stated that the "Best Costume Design fashion show" was the silliest opening Oscar production number since Rob Lowe and Snow White sang "Proud Mary" in 1989. Ken Tucker of Entertainment Weekly bemoaned that the dominance of Best Picture winner Braveheart and the lack of fashion glamour "had the makings of a tiresome evening."

Ratings and reception
The American telecast on ABC drew in an average of 44.81 million people over its length, which was a 9% decrease from the previous year's ceremony. The show also garnered lower Nielsen ratings compared to the previous ceremony, with 30.48% of households watching over a 48.88 share. It also earned a lower 18–49 demographic rating with an 18.76 rating over a 35.27 share among viewers in that demographic.

In July 1996, the ceremony presentation received seven nominations at the 48th Primetime Emmys. Two months later, the ceremony won one of those nominations for Greg Brunton's lighting design and direction during the telecast.

Christopher Reeve appearance
At the ceremony, Christopher Reeve presented a montage of films which tackled social issues. His appearance was a surprise to the majority of those present and occurred less than a year after the horse-riding accident in which he was paralyzed. Reeve's appearance was kept secret in part so that if any physical issue came about, he could drop out quietly. He attended an early morning closed-door rehearsal, during which he vetoed the idea of using John Williams' 1978 Superman Theme as entrance music. Reeve, along with Jones, had chosen the film clips used in the montage. Reeve received a two-minute standing ovation at during his appearance.

In Memoriam
The annual In Memoriam tribute was presented by Academy President Arthur Hiller. The montage featured an excerpt of the main title of The Prince of Tides composed by James Newton Howard.

Ginger Rogers
Miklós Rózsa – Composer
Maxine Andrews
Michael V. Gazzo
Dean Martin
Viveca Lindfors
Martin Balsam
Friz Freleng – Animator
Burl Ives
Butterfly McQueen
Dorothy Jeakins – Costume Designer
Nancy Kelly
Lana Turner
Elisha Cook Jr.
Ida Lupino
Harry Horner – Art Director
Terry Southern – Writer
Haing S. Ngor
Michael Hordern
Don Simpson – Producer
Ross Hunter – Producer
Frank Perry – Director
Alexander Godunov 
Louis Malle – Director
Howard Koch – Writer
George Burns

A separate tribute to actor, dancer and veteran Oscar host Gene Kelly featured tap dancer Savion Glover dancing to the song "Singin' in the Rain" from the 1952 film of the same name.

See also

 2nd Screen Actors Guild Awards
 16th Golden Raspberry Awards
 38th Grammy Awards
 48th Primetime Emmy Awards
 49th British Academy Film Awards
 50th Tony Awards
 53rd Golden Globe Awards
 List of submissions to the 68th Academy Awards for Best Foreign Language Film

References

Bibliography

External links
Official websites
 Academy Awards Official website
 The Academy of Motion Picture Arts and Sciences Official website
 Oscar's Channel at YouTube (run by the Academy of Motion Picture Arts and Sciences)
 The Academy of Motion Picture Arts and Sciences Video Highlights

Analysis
 1995 Academy Awards Winners and History Filmsite
 Academy Awards, USA: 1996 Internet Movie Database

News resources
 Academy Awards coverage CNN

Other resources
 

1995 film awards
1996 in the United States
Academy Awards ceremonies
1996 in Los Angeles
1996 in American cinema
March 1996 events in the United States
Academy
Television shows directed by Jeff Margolis